Václav Dudl (born 22 September 1999) is a Czech footballer who plays for Sparta Prague B as a left back.

Club career
He made his senior league debut for Sparta Prague on 16 October 2016 in a Czech First League 3–0 home win against Vysočina Jihlava at the age of 17 years and 24 days.

Honours 
Spartak Trnava
 Slovak Cup: 2018–19

References

External links 
 
 Václav Dudl official international statistics
 
 Václav Dudl profile on the AC Sparta Prague official website

1999 births
People from Hořovice
Living people
Czech footballers
Czech Republic youth international footballers
Association football defenders
AC Sparta Prague players
FC Sellier & Bellot Vlašim players
FC Silon Táborsko players
FC Spartak Trnava players
Czech First League players
Czech National Football League players
Slovak Super Liga players
Czech expatriate footballers
Expatriate footballers in Slovakia
Czech expatriate sportspeople in Slovakia
Sportspeople from the Central Bohemian Region